IJke Buisma (21 March 1907 – 20 March 1994) was a Dutch athlete. She competed in the women's high jump at the 1928 Summer Olympics.

References

External links
 

1907 births
1994 deaths
Athletes (track and field) at the 1928 Summer Olympics
Dutch female high jumpers
Olympic athletes of the Netherlands
People from Aalsmeer
Sportspeople from North Holland